Albrecht, Duke and Crown Prince of Württemberg (Albrecht Maria Alexander Philipp Joseph; 23 December 1865 – 31 October 1939) was the last Württemberger crown prince, a German military commander of the First World War, and the head of the House of Württemberg from 1921 to his death.

Early life 
Duke Albrecht was born in Vienna as the eldest child of Duke Philipp of Württemberg and his wife Archduchess Maria Theresa of Austria, daughter of Archduke Albert, Duke of Teschen.

Albrecht entered the armies of the Kingdom of Württemberg and the German Empire in 1883, rose quickly through its ranks, and became the heir apparent to the throne of Württemberg.

In 1910, Albrecht attended the funeral of Edward VII. He was a second cousin once removed of Mary of Teck, who was the Queen consort of George V.

World War I 
When World War I began, Duke Albrecht's VI Inspectorate Corps was formed into the 4th Army, 123 battalions strong. As King William II had no sons, Albrecht was appointed the army's commander and assigned to the Ardennes, with Walther von Lüttwitz serving as his chief of staff. This army he led to victory alongside Crown Prince Wilhelm's 5th Army at the Battle of the Ardennes in August 1914. Following that victory, the 4th Army saw action in the First Battle of the Marne before being transferred to Flanders in October, where Albrecht commanded them during the Battle of the Yser. Albrecht also commanded the German forces during the Second Battle of Ypres, where poison gas was used on a large scale for the first time.

Albrecht was awarded the Pour le Mérite in August 1915 and promoted to Generalfeldmarschall in August 1916. The new Army Group Duke Albrecht was placed under his command in February 1917, and he was responsible for the southern sector of the Western Front until the Armistice.

Postwar 
Albrecht had become heir presumptive to the Kingdom of Württemberg following the death of his father in October 1917, but the German Empire's World War I defeat and the abdication of his cousin King Willhelm II of Württemberg following the German Revolution prevented him from ever succeeding to the throne. He became head of the House of Württemberg after the death of Wilhelm on October 2, 1921.

Albrecht died at Altshausen Castle. His son Duke Philipp Albrecht succeeded him as head of the House of Württemberg.

Family 

Albrecht was married in Vienna on 24 January 1893 to Archduchess Margarete Sophie of Austria, a daughter of Archduke Carl Ludwig. They had seven children:
 Philipp Albrecht, Duke of Württemberg (1893–1975).
 Duke Albrecht Eugen of Württemberg (born 8 January 1895 in Stuttgart; died 24 June 1954 in Schwäbisch Gmünd), who married Princess Nadezhda of Bulgaria (1899–1958), daughter of Tsar Ferdinand I. They had five children.
 Duke Carl Alexander of Württemberg (born 12 March 1896 in Stuttgart; died 27 December 1964 in Altshausen), a Benedictine monk known as "Father Odo".
 Duchess Maria Amalia of Württemberg (born 15 August 1897 in Gmunden; died 13 August 1923 in Altshausen), briefly engaged to Crown Prince George of Saxony.
 Duchess Maria Theresa of Württemberg (born 16 August 1898 in Stuttgart; died 26 March 1928 in Eibingen).
 Duchess Maria Elisabeth of Württemberg (born 12 September 1899 in Potsdam; died 15 April 1900 in Meran).
 Duchess Margarita Maria of Württemberg (born 4 January 1902 in Stuttgart; died 22 April 1945 in Altshausen).

Decorations and awards

Ancestry

Notes

References

External links
 Albrecht, Duke of Württemberg
 Pictures of the children of Albrecht ( 2009-10-25)

1865 births
1939 deaths
Nobility from Vienna
German Roman Catholics
Dukes of Württemberg (titular)
Members of the Württembergian Chamber of Lords
German Army personnel of World War I
Field marshals of the German Empire
Pretenders to the throne of Württemberg
Military personnel of Württemberg
German landowners
Knights of the Golden Fleece of Austria
Grand Crosses of the Order of Saint Stephen of Hungary
Recipients of the Military Merit Cross (Mecklenburg-Schwerin), 1st class
Grand Crosses of the Military Order of Max Joseph
Annulled Honorary Knights Grand Cross of the Royal Victorian Order
Grand Crosses of the Order of Saint-Charles
Recipients of the Pour le Mérite (military class)
Military personnel from Vienna
Non-inheriting heirs presumptive